Janice Metcalf (born July 10, 1952) is a retired American professional tennis player. She played on the men's tennis team at the University of Redlands. She reached the top 15 in the United States and the top 40 in the world. In 1975 she won the singles title at the Torneo Godó in Barcelona defeating Iris Riedel in the final. Because of a knee injury, she retired in 1977.

She was inducted into the ITF Women's Hall of Fame in 2008.

Career finals

Doubles (1 loss)

References

External links
 
 Inductee page at ITA Women's Hall of Fame site

American female tennis players
1952 births
Living people
University of Redlands alumni
Universiade medalists in tennis
Universiade bronze medalists for the United States
21st-century American women